Del Norte County Regional Airport  (Jack McNamara Field) is a public airport three miles northwest of Crescent City, in Del Norte County, California, United States. It has one airline flight per day to and from Oakland under the Essential Air Service program. The National Plan of Integrated Airport Systems for 2011–2015 categorized it as a primary commercial service airport (i.e. more than 10,000 enplanements per year).

History
The airfield was used during World War II as Crescent City Outlying Field supporting Naval Air Station Alameda. and a naval radio station at Point Saint George. High-frequency direction finding (HFDF) was used for radio intercept. These sites along the coast could track Japanese warships and merchant marine vessels as far away as the Western Pacific.  The other stations in California were at Point Arguello, Farallon Islands and San Diego. Bainbridge Island, Washington also hosted a station.

Facilities and aircraft
The airport covers 544 acres (220 ha) at an elevation of 61 feet (19 m). It has two asphalt runways: 11/29 is 5,000 by 150 feet (1,524 x 46 m) and 17/35 is 5,001 by 150 feet (1,524 x 46 m).

In the year ending July 31, 2019; the airport had 12,565 aircraft operations, average 34 per day: 72% general aviation, 27% air taxi, and 1% military. 26 aircraft were then based at the airport: 65% single-engine and 35% multi-engine.

Historical airline service
By 1950 Southwest Airways Douglas DC-3s were flying to San Francisco, e.g. Crescent City - Eureka/Arcata - Fort Bragg/Mendocino - Ukiah - Santa Rosa - Vallejo/Napa - Oakland - San Francisco. Southwest Airways changed its name to Pacific Air Lines which in 1959 was flying DC-3s or Martin 4-0-4s Crescent City - Eureka/Arcata - San Francisco; Crescent City - Eureka/Arcata - Ukiah - Santa Rosa - San Francisco; or Crescent City - Eureka/Arcata - Redding - Red Bluff - Chico - Marysville/Yuba City - Sacramento - San Francisco. Also, nonstop between Crescent City and Medford, Oregon. By 1964 Pacific Air Lines was flying Fairchild F-27s and Martin 4-0-4s to Crescent City on similar multi-stop routings to San Francisco and nonstop to Portland. In 1968 Pacific Air Lines merged with Bonanza Air Lines and West Coast Airlines to form Air West which changed its name to Hughes Airwest in 1970. All Air West flights to the airport in 1968 were Fairchild F-27s.  In 1972 Hughes Airwest F-27s flew San Francisco - Eureka/Arcata - Crescent City - North Bend, Oregon - Corvallis, Oregon - Portland, Oregon - Astoria, Oregon - Tacoma, Washington - Seattle.  By 1980 Hughes Airwest was no longer serving the airport as it had retired its F-27s.

Several commuter airlines served the airport.  In 1976 Eureka Aero Industries was flying nonstop to Eureka/Arcata continuing to Eureka's Murray Field airport with Cessna 402s.  WestAir was serving the airport by the early 1980s and in 1985 was flying Cessna 402s nonstop to Eureka/Arcata and on to Sacramento.  WestAir also offered connecting service via either Eureka/Arcata or Sacramento to San Francisco. WestAir became a United Express airline via a code sharing agreement with United Airlines and in 1994 was flying BAe Jetstream 31s Crescent City - Eureka/Arcata - Sacramento - San Francisco several times a day. In the late 1990s, WestAir was replaced by SkyWest Airlines which in 1999 was operating as United Express from the airport with nonstop and direct Embraer EMB-120 Brasilias to San Francisco International Airport. 

In 2007 SkyWest operating as United Express was continuing to fly Embraer EMB-120s nonstop to both San Francisco and Eureka/Arcata with direct one-stop flights to Sacramento.  SkyWest ended all United Express service into Crescent City in 2015. From August 2017, the only remaining passenger airline service, flown by PenAir with Saab 340s via a code sharing agreement with Alaska Airlines, operated nonstop to the Portland International Airport in Oregon.  This service ended after PenAir filed for bankruptcy.

New airline jet service

On February 28, 2018 Contour Airlines announced it would begin flying an Embraer ERJ-135 regional jet between Crescent City and Oakland with service which began on April 11, 2018.  This new service marked the first time Crescent City had scheduled passenger airline flights operated with a jet aircraft.

Airlines and destinations

Passenger

According to FlightAware, scheduled passenger flights are currently being operated by Contour Airlines with Embraer ERJ-135 regional jets nonstop to Oakland (OAK).

Cargo

Statistics

References

Other sources

 Essential Air Service documents (Docket DOT-OST-1997-2649) from the U.S. Department of Transportation:
 Order 2004-7-29: re-selecting SkyWest, Inc., d/b/a United Express, to provide essential air service at Crescent City, California, at the annual subsidy rate of $816,025 per year for the period ending July 31, 2006.
 Order 2006-6-15: re-selecting SkyWest Airlines, Inc., d/b/a United Express, to provide subsidized essential air service at Crescent City, California, for the two-year period from August 1, 2006, through July 31, 2008, at an annual rate of $957,025.
 Order 2008-4-23: re-selecting SkyWest Airlines, Inc., d/b/a United Express, to provide essential air service at Crescent City, California, at an annual subsidy rate of $1,136,896, through July 31, 2010.
 Order 2010-5-19: re-selecting SkyWest Airlines, Inc., d/b/a United Express, to provide essential air service (EAS) at Crescent City, California, at an annual subsidy rate of $1,781,888. The selection extends from August 1, 2010, through July 31, 2012.
 Order 2012-5-21: re-selecting SkyWest Airlines, Inc., d/b/a United Express, to provide Essential Air Service (EAS) at Crescent City, California, for $1,996,959 annual subsidy.

External links
 

Airports in California
Transportation in Del Norte County, California
Crescent City, California
Essential Air Service
Buildings and structures in Del Norte County, California
Companies based in Del Norte County, California